Bhagowal Khurd is a village located in the district of Gujrat, Punjab, Pakistan, to the south of Jalalpur Jattan.
()Malik Hassan Ali is a Pakistani businessman. He is the founder and CEO of Panjtani Advertising Company based in Gujrat, Punjab, Pakistan. He is a professional graphic designer with many years of professional experience.

Villages in Gujrat District